Ilya Alekseyevich Pervukhin (born 6 July 1991) is a Russian canoeist who has won medals at Olympic, World and European level.

Career 
Pervukhin made his international debut at the 2010 European Championship. 

He won the bronze medal at the 2012 Summer Olympics in the C-2 1000 m event, alongside Alexey Korovashkov.

At the 2013 World Championships, Pervukhin and Viktor Melantyev won the silver medal in the C2 1000 m.

In 2014, Pervukhin competed in both the senior and U23 World and European Championships.  He won gold at the U23 European Championships and the U23 World Championships in the C2 1000 m, and gold in the C4 1000 m at the senior World Championships.

In June 2015, he competed in the inaugural European Games, for Russia in canoe sprint, more specifically, Men's C-2 1000m with Alexey Korovashkov. He earned a silver medal.  The team also won silver in the same event at the 2015 European Championships.  Also in that year, he was awarded the title of Honoured Master of Sport in Russia.

At the 2016 European Championships, Pervukhin and Korovashkov won the gold medal in the C2 1000 m.  He competed in the men's C2 1000 metres at the 2016 Summer Olympics, alongside Ilya Shtokalov, finishing in 5th place.

In the C4 1000 m, he was part of the Russian team which won bronze at the 2017 European Championships.

In 2018, he won bronze in the C2 1000 m at the World Championships, with Kirill Shamshurin.

References

External links

1991 births
Russian male canoeists
Living people
Canoeists at the 2012 Summer Olympics
Canoeists at the 2016 Summer Olympics
Olympic canoeists of Russia
Olympic bronze medalists for Russia
Olympic medalists in canoeing
Medalists at the 2012 Summer Olympics
European Games medalists in canoeing
Canoeists at the 2015 European Games
European Games silver medalists for Russia
Sportspeople from Tver
ICF Canoe Sprint World Championships medalists in Canadian
Canoeists at the 2019 European Games
European Games bronze medalists for Russia
Universiade medalists in canoeing
Universiade gold medalists for Russia
Medalists at the 2013 Summer Universiade